Median sulcus can refer to:
 median sulcus of the tongue
 median sulcus of floor of fourth ventricle
 posterior median sulcus of spinal cord
 posterior median sulcus of medulla oblongata